Nidra Poller is an American writer who has lived in Paris since 1972. She has contributed to English-language publications such as The Wall Street Journal, National Review, FrontPage Magazine, and The New York Sun.

Poller is also a novelist, author of illustrated books for youths, and a translator, notably of the philosopher, Emmanuel Levinas.  Her writings include observations on society and politics, including the Muhammad al-Durrah incident and the Ilan Halimi trial.

She participated in the international counter-jihad conferences in Brussels in 2007 and in 2012.

Bibliography
 Horse York, Ouskokata Publishing, 1980
 Did you know Machu Picchu?, Messidor, 1984
 I beg you, Gregory, Le Seuil, 1993

Notes

Living people
Year of birth missing (living people)
20th-century American novelists
American expatriates in France
American women novelists
American women journalists
20th-century American women writers
21st-century American women
Counter-jihad activists